Ampdale was the site of a railway station on the North Coast railway in northern New South Wales, Australia, located between the towns of Casino and Grafton. The station was provided between 1935 and 1974.

References

Disused regional railway stations in New South Wales
Northern Rivers
Geography of New South Wales
Railway stations in Australia opened in 1935
Railway stations closed in 1974